1984 Kokkilai massacres refers to a series of massacres of Sri Lankan Tamil civilians when the Sri Lankan military attacked the village of Kokkilai and several neighboring villages in Mullaitivu District, Northern Province, Sri Lanka. The attack left several civilians including women and children dead and their property destroyed. The attacks resulted in widespread displacement of native residents and subsequently their lands were colonized by Sinhala settlers.

Incident
On 15 December 1984, a large number of Sri Lankan military troops entered the coastal villages of Kokkilai, Kokkuthoduvai, Alampil, Nayaru and Kumulamunai in Mullaitivu District.  The Sri Lankan Army arrived and announced that several
villages were to vacate within 24 hours. Entire villages in the region such as Kokkilai, Kokkuthuduvai, Karnaddu kerni and Koddai Keri amongst others were ordered to vacate within a day’s time. The military then began killing people and destroying property. 131 civilians were killed including 31 women and 21 children. More than 2,000 families were forced to relocate following the attacks and subsequent colonisation attempts of their lands by the Sinhala population. They remain displaced to this date.

State colonization of Tamil areas
The Kokkilai massacres has come to be viewed as a part of the greater Sri Lankan state sponsored colonization of Sinhalese in Tamil areas.

The Mullaitivu District had historically been a Tamil area, and the population was almost entirely Tamil in the district. The villages situated at the southernmost part of the district, serving as the vital link between the North and the East became favorite targets for colonies of the Government. The fishing villages in the district including Kokkilai were colonized by Sinhala fishermen from Negombo and Chilaw.

In December 1984, the Liberation Tigers of Tamil Eelam reprised these colonization attempts by attacking these newly established colonies in North-East which were heavily protected by Sri Lankan military and Sri Lankan Home Guards who had earlier ethnically cleansed the native Tamil population from these villages.

Following the recapture of the North and East by Government forces, the land border between Mullaitivu District and Trincomalee District were once again colonized with Sinhalese settlers in what were traditionally Tamil lands. Sinhalese were settled in traditionally Tamil land, given land, money to build homes and security provided by the Special Task Force. As a result, the demographics of the region had been significantly altered and a new division called the Weli Oya Divisional Secretariat (a Sinhalese corruption of the Tamil term ""Manal Aru") was carved in the southern parts of the Mullaitivu district. Today the majority of the population in the area is Sinhalese while Tamils have been systematically denied any claim to their lands.

See also
 Sri Lankan state sponsored colonisation schemes
 1984 Manal Aru massacres

References

Massacres in 1984
1984 crimes in Sri Lanka
Attacks on civilians attributed to the Sri Lanka Army
Massacres in Sri Lanka
Mass murder of Sri Lankan Tamils
Sri Lankan government forces attacks in the Sri Lankan Civil War
Terrorist incidents in Sri Lanka in 1984
December 1984 events in Asia